Each of the 12 teams of Minor League Baseball's Eastern League carry a 28-man active roster. Only these players are eligible to play.

Teams may have any number of inactive players on their rosters at a given time who do not count toward active roster limits. Injured players may be placed on the injured list (7-day or 60-day). The temporary inactive list and bereavement list are for players attending to personal matters. Major league players may be placed on rosters for injury rehabilitation for a maximum of 20 days for non-pitchers and 30 days for pitchers.

Players who are ineligible to play due to failure to adhere to the Minor League Drug Prevention and Treatment Program, violations of their contract, who are receiving team disciplinary action, or who are unable to join the team due to visa problems may be placed on the restricted or suspended lists. These players count against a team's active roster limit.

Each team usually has a three-man coaching staff including a manager, hitting coach, and pitching coach. Depending on each Major League Baseball organization's development approach, some teams may have additional coaches.

Northeast Division

Binghamton Mets

Hartford Yard Goats

New Hampshire Fisher Cats

Portland Sea Dogs

Reading Phillies

Somerset Patriots

Southwest Division

Akron RubberDucks

Altoona Curve

Bowie Baysox

Erie SeaWolves

Harrisburg Senators

Richmond Flying Squirrels

See also
List of Southern League team rosters
List of Texas League team rosters

References

Eastern League
Rosters
Eastern League team rosters